Liridon Mulaj (born 4 January 1999) is a Swiss professional footballer who plays as a midfielder for Stade Lausanne.

Professional career
Mulaj made his professional for Neuchâtel Xamax in a 2-3 Swiss Super League loss to FC St. Gallen on 2 September 2018.
In August 2017, Mulaj scored 7 goals in the same game, during a Swiss Cup match against US Montfaucon (final score 21-0).

Mulaj was loaned out to FC Winterthur on 12 January 2019, for the rest of the season.

On 19 August 2022, Mulaj signed with Stade Lausanne.

International career
Born in Switzerland, Mulaj is of Kosovo Albanian descent. He is a former youth international for Switzerland.

References

External links
 
 SFL Profile
 SFV U16 Profile
 SFV U19 Profile
 SFV U20 Profile
 Xamax Profile

1999 births
People from Biel/Bienne
Sportspeople from the canton of Bern
Swiss people of Kosovan descent
Swiss people of Albanian descent
Living people
Swiss men's footballers
Switzerland youth international footballers
Association football midfielders
Neuchâtel Xamax FCS players
FC Winterthur players
SC Kriens players
FC Stade Lausanne Ouchy players
Swiss Challenge League players
Swiss Super League players
Swiss 1. Liga (football) players
2. Liga Interregional players